Gmina Garbów is a rural gmina (administrative district) in Lublin County, Lublin Voivodeship, in eastern Poland.

Neighbouring gminas
Gmina Garbów is bordered by the gminas of Abramów, Jastków, Kamionka, Markuszów, Nałęczów and Niemce.

Villages
The gmina contains the following villages with the status of sołectwo: Bogucin, Borków, Garbów (divided into two sołectwos: Garbów I and Garbów II), Gutanów, Janów, Karolin, Leśce, Meszno, Piotrowice-Kolonia, Piotrowice Wielkie, Przybysławice, Wola Przybysławska (divided into two sołectwos: Wola Przybysławska I and Wola Przybysławska II), and Zagrody.

References

Garbow
Lublin County